Lidziya Hrafeyeva (born 14 December 1985) is a Belarusian cross-country skier and biathlete. She has competed at the Winter Paralympics in 2014 and 2018.

Career 

She claimed her first Paralympic medal after clinching a bronze medal in the women's 6km sitting biathlon event during the 2018 Winter Paralympics. After claiming the bronze medal at the 2018 Winter Paralympics, she hinted about her plans to step into participate at the Summer Paralympics and hinted about to choose the sport of shooting following her success at the biathlon event which also comprises shooting.

Coincidentally both Lidziya and her husband, Dzmitry Loban went onto represent Belarus at the 2018 Winter Paralympics.

Biography 
Lidziya Hrafeyeva was affected in a car accident at the age of 27, which led to the amputations of her legs. Following the accident, she decided to take the sport of Paralympic Nordic skiing in 2014 before being selected to represent Belarus at the 2014 Winter Paralympics.

She married fellow Belarusian Paralympic Nordic skier, Dzmitry Loban who has represented Belarus at the Paralympics in 2010, 2014 and 2018. Lidziya Hrafeyeva was also encouraged to take the sport of cross-country skiing by her husband.

References

External links 
 

1985 births
Belarusian female biathletes
Belarusian female cross-country skiers
Biathletes at the 2014 Winter Paralympics
Biathletes at the 2018 Winter Paralympics
Cross-country skiers at the 2014 Winter Paralympics
Paralympic cross-country skiers of Belarus
Paralympic biathletes of Belarus
Paralympic bronze medalists for Belarus
Medalists at the 2018 Winter Paralympics
Living people
Paralympic medalists in biathlon